Thorleif Petersen (6 July 1884 – 22 February 1958) was a Norwegian gymnast who competed in the 1906 Summer Olympics.

In 1906 he won the gold medal as member of the Norwegian gymnastics team in the team competition. He was a brother of fellow gold medallist Rasmus Petersen, and represented the club Trondhjems TF.

References

1884 births
1958 deaths
Sportspeople from Trondheim
Norwegian male artistic gymnasts
Gymnasts at the 1906 Intercalated Games

Medalists at the 1906 Intercalated Games
20th-century Norwegian people